The list of Spelman College people includes notable alumnae and faculty of Spelman College.

Notable faculty 

 Alma Jean Billingslea (born 1946), civil rights activist and author
 Sylvia Bozeman (born 1947), mathematician and educator
Ayoka Chenzira (born 1953), director, producer, writer, and animator
 Pearl Cleage (born 1948), author
 Jelani Cobb (born 1969), writer, author, educator
 Julie Dash (born 1952), filmmaker
 Christine King Farris (born 1927), author, sister of Martin Luther King Jr.
 Shirley Franklin (born 1945), former Atlanta mayor
 Marionette Holmes, economist
 Beverly Guy-Sheftall (born 1946), black feminist scholar
 Joyce Johnson (born Joyce Finch), concert pianist and college organist
 Sophia B. Jones (1857–1932), first African-American faculty member, organized nursing program
 Shirley McBay (born 1935), founder of the Quality Education for Minorities (QEM) Network
 LaVon Mercer (born 1959), American-Israeli basketball player
 Howard Zinn (1922–2010), historian
 Etta Zuber Falconer (1933–2002), educator and mathematician
 Opal J. Moore (born 1953), educator and poet
 Angelino Viceisza, economist

References

Spelman College
Spelman College